Lekh is a term used in Nepali and other Pahari dialects to describe a mountain or minor range rising into the subalpine (above about  or alpine zones (above about ); either climate zone being sufficiently cool to hold snow in winter but not through the summer.

References
 

Nepali language
Nepali words and phrases